Hùng Sơn may refer to several places in Vietnam, including:

Hùng Sơn, Phú Thọ, a township of Lâm Thao District
Hùng Sơn, Thái Nguyên, a township and capital of Đại Từ District
Hùng Sơn, Bắc Giang, a commune of Hiệp Hòa District
Hùng Sơn, Hải Dương, a commune of Thanh Miện District
Hùng Sơn, Lạng Sơn, a commune of Tràng Định District
Hùng Sơn, Nghệ An, a commune of Anh Sơn District
Hùng Sơn, Thanh Hóa, a commune of Tĩnh Gia District